Ouerdanin is a town and commune in the Monastir Governorate, Tunisia. 
It's a recently settled village that relies heavily on its export of olive oil and fruits.

See also
List of cities in Tunisia

References

Populated places in Monastir Governorate
Communes of Tunisia